The Crezz is a British television drama produced by Thames Television and shown on the ITV network in 1976. Created by Clive Exton, The Crezz was set in a fictitious West London crescent, Carlisle Crescent. The series was 12 one-hour programmes each focused on a different household. The series was broadcast on ITV at 9pm to start with but midway through it was put back to 10.35pm because the series didn't achieve the viewing figures that were hoped for.

Regular Cast
Joss Ackland as Charles Bronte
Elspet Gray as Jackie Bronte
Briony McRoberts as Esther Bronte
Joan Hickson as Emily Bronte
Isla Blair as Emma Antrobus
Anthony Nicholls as Cyril Antrobus
Peter Bowles as Ken Green
Carole Nimmons as Sue Green
Hugh Burden as Dr. Bernard Balfour-Harvey
Janet Key as Brenda Pitman
Nicholas Ball as Colin Pitman
Jiggy Bhore as Consuela
Roland Curram as Terry
Paul Greenhalgh as Denny
Aimée Delamain as Lady Clarke
Gerald James as Major Rice
Eileen O'Brien as Bridget Macarthy
Alan Devlin as Joe Macarthy
Elizabeth Begley as Mrs. Macarthy
Gillian Raine as Angela Hart
Anton Phillips as Clarence Henderson
Frank Mills as George Smith
Hilda Braid as Molly Smith
Linda Robson as Jane Smith
Lee Walker as Bing Smith
Ronald Fraser as Gavin Maddox
Tariq Yunus as Hafez Aziz
Bob Hoskins as Detective Sergeant Marble

References
Notes

Bibliography

External links

1976 British television series debuts
1976 British television series endings
1970s British drama television series
ITV television dramas
Television shows set in London
Television series by Fremantle (company)
Television shows produced by Thames Television
English-language television shows
Television series created by Clive Exton